Rylstone was an electoral district of the Legislative Assembly in the Australian state of New South Wales, named after and including the town of Rylstone. The district was created when multi-member constituencies were abolished in 1894, and comprised the eastern part of Mudgee and the western part of The Upper Hunter. The district was abolished in 1904 as a result of the 1903 New South Wales referendum, which reduced the number of members of the Legislative Assembly from 125 to 90, and was divided between Hartley, Singleton and the Upper Hunter.

Members for Rylstone

Election results

References

Former electoral districts of New South Wales
Constituencies established in 1894
1894 establishments in Australia
Constituencies disestablished in 1904
1904 disestablishments in Australia
New England (New South Wales)